George Allen may refer to:

Politics and law
 George E. Allen (1896–1973), American political operative and one-time head coach of the Cumberland University football team
 George Allen (Australian politician) (1800–1877), Mayor of Sydney and NSW politician
 George Allen (American politician) (born 1952), former Virginia Governor and U.S. Senator
 George Allen (New Zealand politician) (1814–1899), Mayor of Wellington, New Zealand, for three weeks
 George Allen, founding partner of international law firm Allen & Overy
 George E. Allen Sr. (1885–1972), Virginia state senator and U.S. Supreme Court trial attorney
 George E. Allen Jr. (1914–1990), Virginia attorney
 George R. Allen (1838–1901), Wisconsin state assemblyman
 George V. Allen (1903–1970), United States diplomat
 George Wigram Allen (1824–1885), Australian politician
 George Baugh Allen (1821–1898), Welsh lawyer
 George Van Allen (1890–1937), provincial politician from Alberta, Canada
 George L. Allen (1811–1882), Toronto chief constable (1847–1852), governor of Toronto Jail (1852–1872)
 George Allen (public servant) (1852–1940), Australian public servant
 W. George Allen, first African-American to graduate from the University of Florida School of Law

Sports
 George Allen (defensive tackle) (1944–1987), American college and professional football player
 George Allen (American football coach) (1918–1990), American football coach
 George E. Allen (coach) (1911–1997), American football player and coach of football and basketball
 George Allen (footballer, born 1932) (1932–2016), English footballer
 George Allen (footballer, born 1948) (1948–1971), Australian rules footballer for Sunshine
 George Allen (footballer, born 1928), Australian rules footballer for South Melbourne
 George Allen (ice hockey) (1914–2000), Canadian ice hockey player
 Gubby Allen (Sir George Oswald Browning Allen, 1902–1989), Australian-born English cricketer
 George Allen (cricketer) (1949–1990), West Indian cricketer

Other
 George Allen (Vermont clergyman) (1808–1876), college professor and clergyman
 George Allen (publisher) (1832–1907), English craftsman and engraver, assistant to John Ruskin
 George Allen (architect) (1837–1929), New Zealand architect, surveyor, teacher and tourist guide
 George Allen (ichthyologist) (1923–2011), American ichthyologist and fisheries scientist, Professor at Humboldt State University
 George Nelson Allen (1812–1877), American composer and geologist
 George Vance Allen (1894–1970), first Vice-Chancellor of the University of Malaya
 George Warner Allen (1916–1988), British artist
 George C. Allen II, American general
 George Allen and Sons, publishers
 George Cyril Allen (1900–1982), British economist
 George W. G. Allen (1891–1940), pioneered aerial photography for archaeological research

See also
George Allan (disambiguation)
Georg Frederik Ferdinand Allen (1856–1925), Danish singing teacher, conductor and composer